Ethienne Reynecke (born 20 March 1982) is a South African rugby union player. His primary position is hooker.

Career

Lions
At the end of 2001, after his second year representing the Under–19 team, he was included in the pre-season training squad for the 2002 Vodacom Cup, following it up with appearances in the 2003 and 2004 seasons. He was also part of the Currie Cup training squad in 2004, playing all the warm-up games.

Griffons
In 2005, he joined Welkom-based side  for one year, being involved in their Vodacom Cup and Currie Cup campaigns.

Return to Lions
He returned to the Golden Lions at the end of 2005. He was included in the  squad prior to the 2006 Super 14 season before getting injured. He subsequently made three appearances in the 2006 Vodacom Cup side before breaking into Currie Cup side for the first time, making his Currie Cup debut for the Golden Lions in their match against . and playing in all fourteen matches that season.

He was also included in a Springbok training squad in 2007.

He wasn't included in the  squad for 2009 Super 14, instead captaining the Vodacom Cup team in the 2009 Vodacom Cup season.

Saracens
In 2009, it was announced that he joined English Premiership side Saracens, where he played for two seasons.

Stormers
He made two substitute appearances for them, as well as two appearances for their Vodacom Cup side,  in the 2011 Vodacom Cup.

Connacht
He then joined Irish Pro12 side Connacht on a two-year deal for the 2011–12 season, making 44 appearances in the Heineken Cup and Pro 12 competitions.

Free State Cheetahs

Pau
He returned to Europe a few months later, joining French Pro D2 side Pau as a medical joker during the 2013–14 Rugby Pro D2 season.

Other
In addition, Reynecke also played for a World XV against an Asia-Pacific Barbarians side in the 2011 Chartis Cup in Hong Kong in aid of the 2011 Tōhoku earthquake and tsunami disaster. He also played for the South African Barbarians in 2013 against former side Saracens in 2013.

After pro rugby, Reynecke turned his focus to MMA and trained at the WWE Performance Center in Orlando, FL.

In 2018 Reynecke suffered a series of near-death experiences, namely an ischemic stroke, leaving him with the permanent disability Aphasia. Fortunately, he recovered and in 2020 became the South Africa IMMAF light-heavyweight champion.

Reynecke is now a stroke ambassador, raising awareness and supporting survivors.

References

1982 births
Living people
South African rugby union players
Golden Lions players
Griffons (rugby union) players
Lions (United Rugby Championship) players
Saracens F.C. players
Stormers players
Western Province (rugby union) players
Connacht Rugby players
Free State Cheetahs players
Rugby union hookers
Afrikaner people
Rugby union players from Johannesburg